Toril Førland (born 24 April 1954) is a retired Norwegian alpine skier.

She was born in Bærum, and represented the club Bærums SK. She participated at the 1972 Winter Olympics in Sapporo, where she competed in slalom, giant slalom and downhill.

She became Norwegian champion in slalom in 1971 and 1973, in giant slalom in 1973, in downhill in 1973 and 1974, and in alpine combined in 1971, 1972, 1973 and 1974.

References

External links

1954 births
Living people
Sportspeople from Bærum
Norwegian female alpine skiers
Olympic alpine skiers of Norway
Alpine skiers at the 1972 Winter Olympics